Maluti-a-Phofung  Local Municipality is an administrative area in the Thabo Mofutsanyane District of the Free State in South Africa. It encompasses substantially all of the former bantustan of QwaQwa, except for the small enclave (detached portion) at Botshabelo. The population is almost entirely Southern Sotho. The municipality is named after the Drakensberg mountains (known as "Maluti" in Sesotho). The peak in QwaQwa is known as the Sentinel, which is called "Phofung" in Sesotho.

Problems 
Maluti-a-Phofung is one of the very poor municipalities in the Free State; as of 2011 over 82% live below the poverty line. Prior to 1994, the area was relatively prosperous with over 250,000 people employed in the textile and furniture industries, mostly at low wages. The new South African government terminated industrial subsidies.  That and labor agitation for higher wages made the factories uneconomic, and over the next decade most of the factories closed. The last one closed in 2010. At present government is the largest employer followed by a weak retail employment. The municipality itself has been in substantial debt for decades, and owes a considerable debt to both the regional water and electrical utilities (R3,769 million).

Municipal services 
The failure to deliver adequate municipal services has been a chronic problem since at least 2000. As a result, there have been a number of protests by the populace, among which was the one in Harrismith in 2004.

In 2018, local residents held a mass protest concerning the failure to provide municipal services.  The protest turned into a riot, shopping malls were looted, and one man was fatally shot. As a result, Cogta (the Free State Department of Cooperative Governance and Traditional Affairs) intervened and administration was removed from the mayor and local council and placed directly under Cogta, a move welcomed by the South African Municipal Workers' Union.

As of June 2022, there have been some improvements, with delivery of water stabilising, and a better relationship with Eskom.

Politics 

The municipal council consists of sixty-nine members elected by mixed-member proportional representation. Thirty-five councillors are elected by first-past-the-post voting in thirty-five wards, while the remaining thirty-four are chosen from party lists so that the total number of party representatives is proportional to the number of votes received. In the election of 3 August 2016 the African National Congress (ANC) won a majority of forty-seven seats on the council.

Election results 
The 2021 election saw the African National Congress (ANC) lose its majority for the first time. Although it still finished with the most seats, a rival grouping led by the MAP16 Civic Movement, founded by a group of ANC councillors who had been expelled for voting to unseat the ANC mayor, who was facing corruption charges, formed a coalition to take control. Maluti-a-Phofung became the first local municipality in the Free State not to be governed by the ANC.

The coalition consists of the MAP16 Civic Movement, Economic Freedom Fighters, Dikwankwetla Party, African Transformation Movement, African Independent Congress and the South African Royal Kingdoms Organization, supported by the Democratic Alliance and Freedom Front Plus.

The following table shows the results of the election.

2019 municipal by-elections
In 2019, the African National Congress (ANC) expelled sixteen of its municipal councillors (fifteen ward councillors and one PR councillor) for defying a Provincial Executive Committee (PEC) decision by siding with opposition parties to remove executive mayor Vusi Tshabalala. All fifteen ward councillors contested the by-elections as independent candidates in their respective wards on 28 August 2019, of whom ten were elected. The ANC managed to retain five wards, despite strenuous canvassing by the provincial leadership and former premier Ace Magashule. The table below depicts the new composition of the council.

Main places 
The 2001 census divided the municipality into the following main places:

Notes and references

External links
 Official website

Local municipalities of the Thabo Mofutsanyane District Municipality